Ray Brown / Milt Jackson is an album by bassist Ray Brown and vibraphonist Milt Jackson recorded in 1965 and released on the Verve label.

Reception
The Allmusic review awarded the album 4½ stars.

Track listing

 "Lined with a Groove" (Ray Brown) - 5:34 
 "For Someone I Love (What's Your Story)" (Milt Jackson) - 4:35 
 "Dew and Mud" (Jimmy Heath) - 4:19 
 "I Just Can't Fool Myself" (Brown) - 6:16 
 "Lazy Theme" (Oscar Peterson) - 4:53 
 "Now Hear My Meaning" (Jimmy Woods) - 5:16 
 "In a Crowd" (John Lewis) - 6:05 
 "Monterey Mist" (Jackson) - 3:35 
Recorded in New York City on January 4 & 5, 1965

Personnel
Milt Jackson – vibes
Ray Brown - bass
Ernie Royal, Clark Terry, Snooky Young - trumpet
Jimmy Cleveland, Urbie Green, Tom McIntosh, Tony Studd - trombone
Ray Alonge - French horn
Bob Ashton, Danny Bank, Jimmy Heath, Romeo Penque, Jerome Richardson, Phil Woods - reeds
Hank Jones - piano
Grady Tate - drums
Oliver Nelson, Jimmy Heath - arranger, conductor

References 

Verve Records albums
Milt Jackson albums
Ray Brown (musician) albums
Albums arranged by Oliver Nelson
1965 albums